Olivia Gonsalves (born 22 July 1993) is a Canadian-born Guyanese footballer who plays as a midfielder. She has been a member of the Guyana women's national team. She is the sister of Julia Gonsalves.

Early life and college career
Gonsalves was brought up in Scarborough, Ontario and attended the University of Toronto between 2011 and 2015.

Club career 
In 2017, she played with Unionville Milliken SC in League1 Ontario.

International career
Gonsalves made her debut for Guyana in 2010. She played at the 2010 CONCACAF Women's World Cup Qualifying and the 2016 CONCACAF Women's Olympic Qualifying Championship.

International goals
Scores and results list Guyana's goal tally first

See also
List of Guyana women's international footballers

References

External links
 

1993 births
Living people
Citizens of Guyana through descent
Guyanese women's footballers
Women's association football midfielders
Guyana women's international footballers
Soccer players from Toronto
Canadian women's soccer players
Toronto Varsity Blues soccer players
Canadian sportspeople of Guyanese descent
Unionville Milliken SC (women) players
League1 Ontario (women) players